Edward House is a building which is located in the Civil Lines area of Karachi, Pakistan It was designed by the Iraqi-Jewish architect Moses Somake in 1910, and named after Somake's son, Ellis Edward.

Architecture 
Edward House is made of local Gizri sandstone and limestone, with ornamental molds. Adjoining, there is another mansion known as Victoria Mansion, which may have also been designed by Samoke given the similarity in style - although no records exist recording his work there.

Use 
It used to house the Cafe Grand, operated by Herbert Bertie Cumper. The cafe was frequented by Karachi's elite, including the founder of Pakistan, Muhammad Ali Jinnah, and his sister Fatima Jinnah. The building also housed the Stars Club - which was re-established in 2017 in the building.

Conservation 

The building is protected by the Sindh Cultural Preservation Act, 1994. The restoration was criticized on the grounds that the Sindh Department of Antiquities awarded works to an inexperienced contractor who "over-restored" the building, and chiseled away some original stone work in attempt to remove the patina which had formed on the building.

References

Tourist attractions in Karachi
1910 establishments in British India
Buildings and structures completed in 1910
Heritage sites in Karachi